George Becker is a New Jersey-based singer, guitarist, and songwriter. He is the founder of Jaded Past.

Early life 
George Becker was born on April 20, 1963, in Elizabeth, New Jersey, to Rosaria Nastasi Becker and George Becker Sr. 

Becker has four children and resides in New Jersey.

Career 
Becker a country rock singer songwriter recording and touring artist. Becker was also the lead singer, guitarist, and front man for the rock band Jaded Past.

He traces his country music style to artist like Brantley Gilbert, Eric Church and Jason Aldean but his early rock influences came from bands like T-Rex, The New York Dolls, Kiss, David Bowie, Elton John, Bon Jovi and Steven Tyler.

In 2012, a self-titled debut album Jaded Past was released early, co-produced by Steve Brown.

In 2016, Becker signed with Melodic Rock Records and released Jaded Past's second album Believe, also produced by Brown.

In 2021, Jaded Past's Live And On Edge was released on Melodic Rock Records. It was a compilation of performances over 2018 - 2020, co-produced by Becker.

In 2021 released his first country crossover album on Melodic Rock Records followed up by numerous digital single releases and has never looked back. 

Cover Bands 
Rat Salad 1979 – 1982
HEX 1982 – 1984
If 6 was 9 1995 – 2006
10 MINUTE LINCOLN 2007 – 2018

Original Bands
Wicked Sin 1984 – 1988, 2010 – 2011
Pretty Pleeze 1988 – 1989
Jaded Past 2011 – 2022
George Becker Solo 2021 - present

Discography
 Wicked Sin Strictly for Pleasure 2010
 Jaded Past EP Bad Influence 2011
 Jaded Past Jaded Past 2012 
 Jaded Past Believe 2016 
 Jaded Past Live And On Edge 2021
 George Becker George Becker 2021
 George Becker ‘’All Alone’’ 2022
 George Becker ‘’You Move To Fast’’ 2023

References

External links
Interview with George Rage Becker at Rock Eyez Webzine
 
 George Becker at Artistdirect

Guitarists from New Jersey
American male singer-songwriters
1963 births
Living people
Singer-songwriters from New Jersey
American male guitarists
20th-century American guitarists
20th-century American male musicians